On 15 December 2010, a DHC-6 Twin Otter passenger aircraft of Tara Air crashed shortly after take-off on a domestic flight from Lamidanda to Kathmandu, Nepal. The wreckage of the aircraft was found in Bilandu forest near the village of Shreechaur the morning after the crash. All 19 passengers and three crew aboard were killed in the crash. There was initial speculation that bad weather or the overloading of the aircraft might have caused the crash. An investigation into the crash was launched by Nepalese authorities after the accident site was located.

Accident

Five minutes after taking off from Lamidanda Airport at 15:08 local time, the left wing of the aircraft impacted land and the DHC-6 crashed. The aircraft was reportedly scheduled to land in Kathmandu at around 15:35, 35 minutes after departure. All 19 passengers and three crew members aboard were killed in the crash.

There was initial speculation that bad weather caused the crash. The chief executive of Tara Air, Vijay Shrestha, said: "It showed poor visibility at different levels of the atmosphere. Thick haze at lower levels and as thick a cloud higher up could have caused poor visibility." There was also speculation that the aircraft could have been overloaded, but Shrestha refuted these allegations. "The aircraft's maximum take-off weight is 12,500 pounds, while the Twin Otter's take-off weight that crashed killing all 22 on board was 12,280 pounds," he said. "So it was underweight by 220 pounds, the allegation is wrong."

Aircraft
The aircraft involved was a DHC-6 Twin Otter bearing the registration 9N-AFX. It was built by de Havilland Canada in 1984 and was operated by several American airlines before it was introduced to Nepal in 2000, when Shangri-La Air purchased the aircraft. In 2010, just shortly before the accident, Tara Air purchased the aircraft.

Search operation
Helicopters searched for the wreckage of the aircraft on the day of the crash, but were called off during the night because of poor visibility, even though night vision equipment was installed on board. All 22 bodies were recovered. The wreckage of the aircraft reportedly covered , and, according to a police spokesperson, had "broken up completely".

Investigation
An investigation into the crash was launched after the accident site was located. Nepal's Ministry of Tourism and Civil Aviation formed a group of five investigators to find the cause of the crash. The five were ordered to present a report on the accident by 90 days after the crash occurred. The cockpit voice recorder was recovered from the scene of the accident.

A separate investigation was also started into alleged irregularities, which, according to The Himalayan Times included "carrying passengers by issuing tickets in other's name, not verifying identity while checking-in passengers and the process of immigration of the foreign nationals who lost their lives in the crash." Police arrested the general manager of a travel agent based in Kathmandu over suspicions of tax evasion during the sale of tickets for the flight.

See also
 2010 in aviation
 Aviation safety
 List of accidents and incidents involving commercial aircraft

References

External links
 Photos of 9N-AFX on Airliners.net

Accidents and incidents involving the de Havilland Canada DHC-6 Twin Otter
Aviation accidents and incidents in 2010
Aviation accidents and incidents in Nepal
2010 in Nepal
History of Nepal (2008–present)
December 2010 events in Asia
2010 disasters in Nepal
Tara Air accidents and incidents